Beaujolais is a historical province and wine-producing region in France. It is located north of Lyon, and covers parts of the departments of Rhône and Saône-et-Loire. The region is known internationally for its long tradition of winemaking, and more recently for the Beaujolais nouveau.

Geography

The historical capital of the province is Beaujeu and the economic capital of the area is Villefranche-sur-Saône.

Wine

Almost all the wine produced in the region is red wine from the Gamay grape, of which the heavily marketed Beaujolais Nouveau is the most well-known, and the village crus the most prized.

Notes and references

 Mathieu Méras, Le Beaujolais au Moyen Age, Lyon, 1956.

 
Former provinces of France
Geography of Rhône (department)
Geography of Saône-et-Loire

de:Beaujolais